The  San Diego Chargers season was the franchise's fourth season in the National Football League (NFL), and its 14th overall.

The team was coming off a season that ended with a 4–9–1 record. Although he was offered a five-year contract toward the end of the previous season, 1973 would prove to be Harland Svare's final season as the team's head coach.

The team obtained quarterback Johnny Unitas in a trade with the Baltimore Colts, but Unitas was a shell of his former greatness. In the middle of the season he was replaced at quarterback by a rookie Dan Fouts, the team's third-round pick in that year's draft.

NFL Draft

Roster

Regular season

Schedule 

Note: Intra-division opponents are in bold text.

Game summaries

Week 4 

Johnny Unitas was knocked out of the game.

Standings

References 

San Diego Chargers
San Diego Chargers seasons
San Diego Chargers f